John Foster (died 1773) was a Canon of Windsor from 1772 to 1773 and Headmaster of Eton College from 1765 to 1773.

Career

He was King's Scholar at Eton College then educated at King's College, Cambridge and graduated BA in 1753, MA in 1756, and DD in 1766.

He was appointed Headmaster of Eton from 1765 to 1773

He was appointed to the twelfth stall in St George's Chapel, Windsor Castle in 1772, and held the stall until 1773.

Notes 

1773 deaths
Canons of Windsor
Head Masters of Eton College
People educated at Eton College
Alumni of King's College, Cambridge
Year of birth missing
Eton King's Scholars